Gary Lake is a former association football player who represented New Zealand at international level.

Lake made his full All Whites debut in a 3–5 loss to Australia on 5 November 1967 and ended his international playing career with 10 A-international caps to his credit, his final cap an appearance in a 0–4 loss to Iraq on 24 March 1973.

References

External links

Year of birth missing (living people)
Living people
New Zealand association footballers
New Zealand international footballers
Association football defenders
1973 Oceania Cup players